Somalia competed at the 2010 Summer Youth Olympics, the inaugural Youth Olympic Games, held in Singapore from 14 August to 26 August 2010. The nation was represented by the Somali Olympic Committee, which sent a total of two athletes to compete in one sport, athletics. The flagbearer at the opening ceremony for the nation was athlete Abdulahi Kulow. Somalia's Olympic team was one of the 106 that did not win a single medal at the Games.

Athletics

Athletics was the only sport Somalia participated in. All two athletes did not make it to the medal final, but instead entered the non-medal ranking finals to compete with other athletes who similarly did not make the mark.

Boys
Track and Road Events

Girls
Track and Road Events

See also 
 Somalia at the Olympics

References

External links
 Competitors List: Somalia – Singapore 2010 official site
 Schedule/Results – Singapore 2010 official site

You
Nations at the 2010 Summer Youth Olympics
Somalia at the Youth Olympics